China Forestry Group Corporation is a Chinese forestry company, established directly under the State Forestry Administration of the People's Republic of China in February 1984  to plant and manage forests in China and internationally, as well as to produce, process, import and export forest products
China Forestry Group Corporation has its headquarters in Beijing and runs business operations in the United States, Canada, New Zealand, Australia, Myanmar, India, Singapore, Russia, France, Uruguay, Brazil, South Africa and Mozambique.

A company with a similar name, China Forestry, was formerly listed on the Hong Kong Stock Exchange, but ceased operations after financial fraud was discovered.

New Zealand operation
As a wholly owned subsidiary of China Forestry Group Corporation, China Forestry Group New Zealand Company Ltd is a New Zealand-registered and -based forest products and management company. The company acquires and manages forest resources, harvesting, wood products transportation, sales and export. Its wood products supply both the New Zealand and international markets. 
China Forestry Group Corporation is keen in further direct investment in forests in New Zealand.

References

External links 
 

Forest products companies of China
Chinese companies established in 1984
Companies based in Beijing